The Arctic Thunder Air Show is an  air show and open house event held biennially at Joint Base Elmendorf-Richardson, Anchorage, Alaska since 1990. It is a free event open to the general public and one of the largest public events in Alaska. The 2010 show was marred by a tragedy due to a C-17 transport plane crash just a few days before the event, but it still managed to draw a crowd estimated at least 100,000. In addition to performances by military teams such as the Thunderbirds and the Blue Angels, the show also features appearances by civilian aerial performers.

References

External links

1990 establishments in Alaska
Air shows in the United States
Aviation in Alaska
Culture of Anchorage, Alaska
Recurring events established in 1990
Tourist attractions in Anchorage, Alaska
Events in Alaska